Man in the Moon is the seventh L.A. Guns album. Long-time vocalist Phil Lewis and guitarist Mick Cripps returned for this album. It is the only L.A. Guns album with bass guitarist Mark Dutton.

Track listing 
 "Man in the Moon" - 4:42
 "Beautiful" - 4:18
 "Good Thing" - 3:27
 "Spider's Web" - 4:37
 "Don't Call Me Crazy" - 6:42
 "Hypnotized" - 3:25
 "Fast Talkin' Dream Dealer" - 4:03
 "Out of Sight" - 3:22
 "Turn It Around" - 5:30
 "Scream" - 4:18

Personnel
 Phil Lewis - lead vocals
 Tracii Guns - guitar
 Mick Cripps - keyboard, guitar
 Muddy Stardust - bass guitar
 Steve Riley - drums

References 

2001 albums
L.A. Guns albums
Albums produced by Gilby Clarke